The so-called Drake's Plate of Brass is a forgery that purports to be the brass plaque that Francis Drake posted upon landing in Northern California in 1579.  The hoax was successful for 40 years, despite early doubts. After the plate came to public attention in 1936, historians raised questions regarding the plate's wording, spelling, and manufacture. The hoax's perpetrators attempted to apprise the plate's finders as to its origins.  Many presumed the plate to be authentic after an early metallurgical study concluded it was genuine. In the late 1970s, scientists determined that the plate was a modern creation after it failed a battery of physical and chemical tests. Much of the mystery surrounding the plate continued until 2003, when historians advanced a theory about who created the plate and why, showing the plate to be a practical joke by local historians gone awry. The plate was acquired by and is often on display at the Bancroft Library of the University of California, Berkeley.

Historical plate

Drake landed somewhere on the Northwest Coast in 1579, rather than the often-cited California shore.  According to a contemporary account by Francis Fletcher, a member of Drake's party, Drake left behind "a plate" as "a monument of our being there" that claimed "her maiesties, and successors right and title to that kingdome". The memoirs also say that the plate included the date of the landing, and under it Drake's name, and the queen's portrait on a sixpence coin.

Fletcher's detailed description of the plate became the recipe for the prank that became the Drake Plate hoax.

Hoax plate: description and text
The plate that came to light in the 1930s matched the description in the historical record in many ways.  It was made of brass, with lettering that appeared to have been chiseled into its face.  There was the hole for a sixpence coin, and the text contained all the content that Fletcher described:

BEE IT KNOWNE VNTO ALL MEN BY THESE PRESENTS.
IVNE.17.1579
BY THE GRACE OF GOD AND IN THE NAME OF HERR
MAIESTYQVEEN ELIZABETH OF ENGLAND AND HERR
SVCCESSORS FOREVER, I TAKE POSSESSION OF THIS
KINGDOME WHOSE KING AND PEOPLE FREELY RESIGNE
THEIR RIGHT AND TITLE IN THE WHOLE LAND VNTO HERR
MAIESTIEES KEEPEING. NOW NAMED BY ME AN TO BEE
KNOWNE V(N) TO ALL MEN AS NOVA ALBION.
G. FRANCIS DRAKE
(Hole for sixpence)

Origins
The origins of the plate were a matter of debate and rumor for much of its history and historians have recently painted a clear picture. The plate was crafted in 1917 by historian Herbert E. Bolton, a professor at the University of California at Berkeley. He had several accomplices in the plot including a fall guy in the case that the plate was found to be a forgery. It was done to foil the work of archaeologist Zelia Nuttall who had been promoting her work and findings that Drake was never in California waters at all. Bolton and his cohorts prevented Nuttall from publishing her work, and so did not launch the plate until 1936 when Tudor historian Eva Taylor found even more evidence that Drake was further north, on the Northwest Coast. Taylor’s findings were compelling. By 1936 the paradigm was shifting; scholars were looking to the northwest for Drake’s fair bay. Then seemingly out of the blue the Drake Plate of Brass, alleged to be the actual land claim plaque created by Drake, was found on a hillside overlooking San Francisco Bay. This fantastic find was trumped by Herbert E. Bolton, and it ended any further consideration of Nuttall and Taylor’s evidence. It was only in 1977 that the plate was declared a hoax, but by then the question had been mostly forgotten and the paradigm of Drake in California was fossilized.

The cover story for the plate was that it was a joke on Bolton that got out of hand. Though it is likely that the plate hoax was designed as a ploy to obstruct the Northwest Coast landing theory, the hoaxers’ primary motivation may have been about dazzling the public with historical artifacts, polishing reputations, and gaining fame, students, and funding support for their universities and particular projects.

However, the plate hoax was concocted by an important historian who risked his reputations if his machinations were uncovered. The plate became a potent symbol of California, and of American’s English heritage, and underscored the ideology of Manifest destiny and the conviction that God destined the English to populate North America.

Working for ten years, a team of four researchers thought they pieced together a complete narrative of the out-of-hand joke, though that theory is now discounted with new evidence that historian Herbert Bolton was actually behind the creation of the plate (see Thunder Go North, the Hunt for Sir Francis Drake's Fair & Good Bay, by Melissa Darby 2019). The four—Edward Von der Porten, Raymond Aker, Robert W. Allen, and James M. Spitze—published their account in California History in 2002.

Creation
According to the 2002 account, the plate was intended to be a joke among members of a playful fraternity of California history enthusiasts, the Ancient and Honorable Order of E Clampus Vitus ("ECV"). The ECV had originated during the 1849 California Gold Rush and was revived in the 1930s by Carl Wheat, George Ezra Dane, and Leon Whitsell as a fraternity of historians and Western lore enthusiasts. ECV describes itself as "dedicated to the erection of historical plaques, the protection of widows and orphans, especially the widows, and having a grand time while accomplishing these purposes." Pranks at fellow Clampers' expense were a regular part of the group's activities.

George Ezra Dane, an ECV leader, was blamed for initiating the hoax as a joke intended for fellow "Clamper" Herbert Bolton to find.  The plate was likely made by George Clark in his workshop in 1917 working with Bolton's design.

The target of the hoax, Herbert Eugene Bolton, had a special interest in the plate.  Bolton was a distinguished professor of California history and director of the Bancroft Library at the University of California. Over his career, he exhorted students to look for the plate—and to contact him if they ever heard of an artifact matching the historical description.

According to the 2002 account, Dane initiated the plot. George Haviland Barron, a former curator of American history at the De Young Museum in San Francisco, designed the plate and bought the brass at a nearby shipyard, where a worker cut the plate from modern brass with a modern guillotine shear.  George Clark, an inventor and art critic, and appraiser, hammered the letters into the plate with a simple cold chisel.  Clark told his wife that the "C.G."—later taken to stand for "Captain General"—before Drake's name was essentially his own signature. As a final mark of the gag, Lorenz Noll (1891–1962) and Albert Dressler (1887–1960) painted "ECV" on the back of the plate in paint visible under ultraviolet light.

Discovery and loss
Von der Porten, Aker, and Allen surmise that the conspirators probably planted the plate in Marin in 1933, not far from the supposed location of Drake's landing.  William Caldeira, a chauffeur, found the plate while his employer, Leon Bocqueraz, was hunting near the shores of Drake's Bay with a companion, Anson Stiles Blake.  Bocqueraz was a banker, while Blake was a prominent and active Berkeley alumnus.  Both were members of the California Historical Society.

Caldeira showed the dirt-covered plate to Bocqueraz, then stowed the plate in the car to investigate later and then forgot about it. Some weeks later, he found it while cleaning the car on the San Rafael Ferry and threw it away on the side of the road in San Rafael—several miles from its original location, but still in the Marin area.  This was the first of a series of events that ultimately spun the joke out of the conspirators' control.

Re-discovery and publicity
The plate was found again, three years later, in 1936, by Beryle Shinn, a shop clerk.  Shinn showed it to a friend, a Berkeley student, who suggested that he take the plate to Bolton. In February 1937, Shinn brought it to Bolton, which to Bolton was fulfillment of a decades-old professional dream.  Bolton compared it to Francis Pretty's contemporaneous description of the plate. He alerted Robert Gordon Sproul, the University of California president, and Allen L. Chickering, the president of the California Historical Society, to the possibility of a major find.  Chickering and Bolton negotiated to buy the plate, offering to pay $2,500 and to assume all risk regarding the authenticity of the plate.

Then another series of events took the hoax to the next level. One day after agreeing in principle to sell the plate, Shinn took it back from Bolton, saying he wanted to show it to his uncle and then return it. Bolton and Chickering did not hear from Shinn again for four days.  Apparently frightened that they might lose this major opportunity, Chickering moved to quickly buy the plate for $3,500.  The plate was then given to the University's Bancroft Library.

Bolton soon announced at a California Historical Society meeting, on April 6, 1937, "One of the world's long-lost historical treasures apparently has been found!... The authenticity of the tablet seems to me beyond all reasonable doubt."  Now, having only minimally investigated the plate, Bolton and Chickering had publicly committed themselves, personally and professionally, and their institutions to the authenticity of the plate.

Early doubts
Skeptics pointed out many suspicious elements of the plate.  Reginald B. Haselden, a specialist in Elizabethan literature, published a critique of the plate in the September 1937 issue of California History, outlining a list of problems. The spelling seemed modern.  The wording did not match normal Elizabethan forms. For example, the plate reads "Queen Elizabeth", not the standard style "Elizabeth, by the Grace of God, Queen of England, France and Ireland, Defender of the Faith". The plate contains the modern forms "the" and "this" instead of the 16th-century "ye" and "y(i)s". Physically, the plate seemed too uniform and the patina suspect.  Yet none of these elements by themselves seemed to determine the matter, alternative interpretations of each being available. Haselden's points were immediately disputed.  Chickering published a defense of the plate in the same issue of California Monthly.

Conspirators' supposed warnings
One Clamper related that the plate was placed in an area where there were several popular hiking trails so that they could stage a “surprise” find by Bolton. One of the Clampers recalled “the whole discovery was mixed up because it was picked up by somebody and thrown in a car.”  It seems that while most of the members of the Yerba Buena chapter of the Clampers may have thought it was just a joke on Bolton, there was an inner circle working with Bolton and knew that Bolton was orchestrating the hoax.

Bolton was in on the whole joke that got out of hand, but needed to be protected in case the plate was found to be a fake.  The old theory that there were various spoofs done to tip off Bolton is absurd, and this speculation seems contrived. This was a lot of plotting for just a joke. Bolton was the Grand Royal Historian of the Clampers, he had a phone, and one of his fellow Clampers could have just called and told him that the plate was a joke before Bolton made the big announcement in front of the California Historical Society at the Sir Francis Drake Hotel. In fact, just before the Preposterous booklet was printed, fellow Clamper, (and the person accused of the hoax) George Ezra Dane, sent Bolton a promotional flyer soliciting preorders. Printed in the flyer was an interesting comment that may have alluded to the truth of the scheme: “As history thunders down the corridors of time, the name of E Clampus Vitus and the Francis Drake Plate will be forever joined.”

"Confirmation"
While Bolton and Chickering continued to defend the plate, doubts and rumors continued to circulate.  Sproul, the University president, had become concerned as well. Bolton played down concerns while challenges to the plate’s authenticity were numerous and authoritative, as were demands for analysis of the relic. Journalists at home and abroad, as well as historians and archaeologists, sent requests for at least a good photograph of the plate. Bolton demurred, put off analysis, and did not follow up with experts on specific questions they had about the plate that could help determine its authenticity. A good photograph was not available even by August of 1937 when the editor of Antiquity wrote to Bolton “surely in the case of an object which, if genuine, is of the highest historical importance, at least one really adequate photograph should be made available!” 
Bolton chose Professor Colin Fink, chair of the Division of Electrochemistry of Columbia University, to authenticate the plate.  While the California history community, and certainly Bolton, would have been aware of the Clampers' book of clues, Fink may not have been. In any case, in 1938 Fink and his colleague E. P. Polushkin confirmed the plate as genuine in no uncertain terms: "[I]t is our opinion that the brass plate examined by us is the genuine Drake Plate."

For most observers, this was the definitive statement on the plate's origins.  Photos of the plate appeared in textbooks.  Copies were sold as souvenirs, and a copy was also displayed in the library of Sir Francis Drake High School in San Anselmo (the only high school named after the explorer). On several ceremonial occasions, copies of the plate were presented to Queen Elizabeth II.  Yet rumors of E Clampus Vitus involvement in the plate continued to circulate.

Scientific investigation
In the early 1970s, physics caught up to Haselden's original findings. Professor James D. Hart, director of the Bancroft Library, assembled a re-testing plan in preparation for the 400th anniversary of Drake's landing.  He asked the Research Laboratory for Archaeology, the History of Art at Oxford University, and the Lawrence Berkeley Laboratory for a detailed analysis. The tests included x-ray diffraction, stereo microscopy, and additional metallurgical analysis.  X-ray diffraction and gamma-ray absorption tests revealed the plate to be too smooth, made by modern rolling equipment, not hammered flat by a sixteenth-century hammer.  Dr. Frank Asaro, at the Lawrence Berkeley Laboratory of the University of California, Berkeley, working with colleague Helen Michels, used neutron activation analysis to study the plate and found that it contained far too much zinc and too few impurities to be Elizabethan English brass, while containing trace metals that corresponded to modern American brass. Cyril Stanley Smith of MIT examined the plate under a stereo microscope and found the edges to be consistent with modern cutting equipment.

See also
 His Majesty, McDuck – a 1989 Walt Disney story fashioned after the plate discovery
 New Albion
 Drake Navigators Guild
 Oscar Hartzell – perpetrator of another hoax based on Sir Francis Drake

References

External links
 Plateofbrass.com: The Mystery of the Plate of Brass: California's Greatest Hoax and The Search for its Perpetrators
 Edward Von der Porten, Raymond Aker, Robert W. Allen, and James M. Spitze, "Who made Drake's plate of brass? Hint: it wasn't Francis Drake", California Monthly, March 22, 2002. 
 Fletcher's account of Drake's landing and the real plate (While this is often misattributed to Pretty, the Hakluyt Society has studied this and determined that the Pretty attribution came much later.  The original was published by Drake's nephew, also "Sir Francis Drake," using records from voyage chaplain Francis Fletcher.)
 University of Berkeley press release, including a Flash animation of the story
 Cyril Stanley Smith's 1976 Metallurgical Report on Francis Drake's Brass Plate
 Abstract for article "Chemical Study of the Plate of Brass," H. V. Michel and F. Asaro
 

In-jokes
History of the San Francisco Bay Area
Hoaxes in the United States
1930s hoaxes
Francis Drake